Hynd is a surname. Notable people with the surname include:

Harry Hynd (1900–1985), British Labour Party politician
John Burns Hynd (1902–1971), British Labour politician
Roger Hynd (1942–2017), former Scottish professional footballer who played as a centre-half
Ronald Hynd (born 1931), English choreographer